Nalovardo is a Swedish Ski resort in Sorsele Municipality.

Ski areas and resorts in Sweden